Class 101 is the name given to several types of railway locomotive:
 British Rail Class 101, a British diesel multiple unit
 CIE Class 101, an Irish diesel locomotive 
 DBAG Class 101, a German electric locomotive
 GS&WR Class 101, an Irish steam locomotive
 NIR Class 101, a Northern Irish diesel locomotive